The 2019 Supersport World Championship season was the twenty-third season of the Supersport World Championship, the twenty-first held under this name.

Race calendar and results

Entry list

All entries used Pirelli tyres.

Championship standings
Points

Riders' championship

Bold – Pole positionItalics – Fastest lap

Manufacturers' championship

References

External links 

Supersport
Supersport World Championship seasons